The Korean Basketball League Most Valuable Player Award (MVP) (Korean: 국내선수 MVP) is an annual Korean Basketball League (KBL) award given since 1997 to the best performing player of the regular season. It is only awarded to domestic players (registered as South Korean nationals) as there is a separate award for foreign import players.

Joo Hee-jung, Shin Ki-sung, Kim Seung-hyun, Kim Joo-sung, Yang Dong-geun and Oh Se-keun are the only players to have won both the MVP and Rookie of the Year awards. Kim Seung-hyun is the only one to have won both within the same season.

Winners

Multi-time winners

Teams

Notes

References

External links
Records: Past records / 주요기록: 역대수상현황 on the Korean Basketball League official website 

 

Awards established in 1997
Basketball most valuable player awards
Korean Basketball League awards